Saida may refer to:

Places
 Saïda, Algeria, a city in Algeria
 Saïda Province, a province of Algeria
 Saida, Lebanon, the Arabic name for Sidon, a city in Lebanon
 Saida, a village in Helan, Mandi Bahauddin, Punjab province, Pakistan
 Saida, Syria, a town in Daraa Governorate, Syria
 Seida, Tulkarm, Palestinian village in Tulkarm governorate

Other uses
 Saida (name)
 Saida, one of James Bond's allies in The Man with the Golden Gun
 Saida (crustacean), a prehistoric ostracod genus

See also
 Sayda (disambiguation)